Anabarilius is a genus of ray-finned fish in the family Cyprinidae, most of them only occurring in China. Many of the species have very restricted geographic range and have been negatively impacted by introduced species, fishing, and habitat degradation; the IUCN Red List includes five Anabarilius species that are either endangered or critically endangered and one species (A. macrolepis) that is considered extinct.

Species 
The genus contains the following species:
 Anabarilius alburnops (Regan, 1914)
 Anabarilius andersoni (Regan, 1904)
 Anabarilius brevianalis W. Zhou & G. H. Cui, 1992
 Anabarilius duoyiheensis W. X. Li, W. N. Mao & Zong-Min Lu, 2002
 Anabarilius goldenlineus W. X. Li & A. L. Chen, 1995
 Anabarilius grahami (Regan, 1908)
 Anabarilius liui (H. W. Chang, 1944)
 Anabarilius longicaudatus Y. R. Chen, 1986
 †Anabarilius macrolepis P. L. Yih & C. K. Wu, 1964
 Anabarilius maculatus Y. R. Chen & X. L. Chu, 1980
 Anabarilius paucirastellus P. Q. Yue & J. C. He, 1988
 Anabarilius polylepis (Regan, 1904)
 Anabarilius qiluensis Y. R. Chen & X. L. Chu, 1980
 Anabarilius qionghaiensis Y. R. Chen, 1986
 Anabarilius songmingensis Y. R. Chen & X. L. Chu, 1980
 Anabarilius transmontanus (Nichols, 1925)
 Anabarilius xundianensis J. C. He, 1984
 Anabarilius yangzonensis Y. R. Chen & X. L. Chu, 1980

References 
 

 
Taxa named by Theodore Dru Alison Cockerell
Freshwater fish genera
Ray-finned fish genera
Taxonomy articles created by Polbot